The African Journal on Conflict Resolution is a peer-reviewed academic journal covering conflict management in Africa.

External links 
 

Publications established in 2000
International relations journals
Open access journals
English-language journals